Hypomyces papulasporae is a parasitic ascomycete in the order Hypocreales. It was described as new to science in 1985. The type collection, made in New Zealand, was found growing on the ascomata of Trichoglossum hirsutum (black earth tongues). H. papulasporae has Sibirina- and Papulaspora-like synanamorphs.

References

External links

Fungi described in 1985
Fungi of New Zealand
Hypocreaceae
Inedible fungi
Parasitic fungi